The Gugigin clan are one of nine distinct named clan estate groups of the Yugambeh people and the name refers to the Indigenous people of the Logan area, Queensland, Australia.

Name 
The ethnonym Gugigin has been related to a Yugambeh word, Gugin, which refers the north with -gin meaning "people" and thus means "Northern People". They were the northernmost clan of the Yugambeh.

Language 
The Gugigin people spoke a dialect of the Yugambeh language.

Country 

Their tribal boundaries are said to have extended west to Oxley creek, south to Jimboomba and the Pimpama river, north to Mt Cotton and east to Russell Island and surrounds.
According to John Allen's map, the Gugigin were the northernmost clan, located north of the Mununjali clan on the Logan River, the Wangerriburra in Albert Valley.

See also 
 Yugambeh people
 Wanggeriburra clan
 Kombumerri clan
 Mununjali clan

Citations

Sources 

Aboriginal peoples of Queensland